At War with the Army is a 1950 American musical comedy film directed by Hal Walker, released by Paramount, starring the comedy team of Martin and Lewis and introducing Polly Bergen. Filmed from July through August 1949, the film premiered in San Francisco on New Year's Eve 1950. It was re-released in 1958 by OMAT Pictures.

Although filmed before My Friend Irma Goes West (1950), it was held back until the sequel to Martin and Lewis' smash film debut My Friend Irma (1949) was released.

Plot
The film is set at a United States Army base in Kentucky at the end of 1944, during World War II. 
The protagonists are First Sergeant Vic Puccinelli and Private First Class Alvin Korwin, who were partners in a nightclub song-and-dance act before joining the Army.

Puccinelli wants to be transferred from his dull job to active duty overseas, but is refused transfer and is to be promoted to Warrant Officer. Korwin wants a pass to see his wife and new baby. In addition, they have to rehearse for the base talent show and avoid the wrath of Alvin's platoon sergeant, Sergeant McVey.

Along the way they both sing a few songs, and they do an impression of Bing Crosby and Barry Fitzgerald by recreating a scene from Going My Way (1944) for the talent show. Further complications include a Post Exchange worker who is pregnant, a company commander who gets all his information from his wife, a scheming supply sergeant, and a defective Coca-Cola machine.

Cast

 Dean Martin as 1st Sgt. Vic Puccinelli
 Jerry Lewis as PFC. Alvin Korwin
 Mike Kellin as Sgt. McVey
 Angela Greene as Mrs. Deborah Caldwell
 Tommy Farrell as Cpl. Clark
 Polly Bergen as Helen Palmer
 Jean Ruth as Millie
 William Mendrek as Capt. Ernest Caldwell
 Douglas Evans as Col. Davis
 Kenneth Forbes  as 2nd Lt Davenport
 Danny Dayton as Supply Sgt. Miller
 Paul Livermore as Pvt. Jack Edwards
 Frank Hyers as Cpl. Shaughnessy
 Ty Perry as Lt. Terrey
 Jimmie Dundee as Eddie
 Dick Stabile as Pvt. Pokey
 Dewey Robinson as Bartender
 Joe Gray as Soldier

Production
When Martin and Lewis signed their film contract with Paramount Pictures, they were allowed to make one film "outside" the studio per year through their own company, York Productions. This film was made under that provision, with the stars taking a small salary in exchange for 90 percent of the film's profits.

However, upon its release, Martin and Lewis ended up in a long, drawn-out legal battle. After several years, they relinquished all financial interest in this film in exchange for not having to make any more of these "outside" ones. The copyright on this film was not renewed in 1977, resulting in its public domain status.

The film is based on a play by James B. Allardice that ran for 151 performances from 1948 to 1949 with Mike Kellin and Kenneth Forbes repeating their roles.

The producers opened up the play by adding a sequence of an absent without leave Lewis in drag fending off the amorous advances of his drunken platoon sergeant, a sequence on an obstacle course and the addition of several songs written by Jay Livingston and Ray Evans.

One of the later Martin and Lewis films, Sailor Beware (1952) had a working title of At Sea with the Navy.

Copyright status
This film's copyright was registered to York Pictures Corp. and Screen Associates, Inc. on January 23, 1951 (LP 679), and was renewed on December 7, 1979 (RE43009).  However, the film has since lapsed into the public domain as the copyright holders failed to renew their copyright in the 28th year of publication pursuant to the Copyright Act of 1909.

Home media
As this film is in the public domain, there have been at least a dozen DVD releases from a variety of companies comprising many different quality prints.  In July 2014, Film Chest released a restored version in HD.

See also
 List of films in the public domain in the United States

References

Notes

External links

 
 
 
 
  (source material)
 

1950 films
1950 musical comedy films
Military humor in film
American musical comedy films
American World War II films
American films based on plays
Films directed by Hal Walker
Paramount Pictures films
Films about the United States Army
American black-and-white films
1950s English-language films
1950s American films